N'Faly Dante (born 19 October 2001) is a Malian college basketball player for the Oregon Ducks of the Pac-12 Conference. He was a five-star recruit who attended Sunrise Christian Academy in Bel Aire, Kansas.

High school career
Dante attended Sunrise Christian Academy in Bel Aire, Kansas. In his junior season, he averaged 16 points, nine rebounds, and three assists per game, leading his team to a 22–6 record and its first GEICO Nationals appearance.

Recruiting
Dante was a consensus five-star recruit, one of the best centers in his class, and the number one recruit from Kansas. On 13 August 2019, in a letter addressed to his mother on The Players' Tribune, he announced his reclassification to the 2019 class and committed to play college basketball for Oregon.

College career
On 15 October 2019, Dante was ruled ineligible to start the 2019–20 season because the National Collegiate Athletic Association (NCAA) missed his clearance date. He reenrolled at the University of Oregon on 14 December. Dante made his debut for the Ducks on 18 December, scoring 11 points in an 81–48 win over Montana. On 18 January 2020, Dante injured his knee in a game against Washington and missed several weeks. On 9 December 2020, Dante scored a career high 22 points in an 87-66 win over Florida A&M. On 19 December, he was ruled out for the season with a torn ACL. Dante averaged 8.2 points and 5.8 rebounds per game, shooting 65.6 percent from the field as a sophomore.

National team career
With Mali at the 2016 FIBA Under-17 World Championship in Zaragoza, Spain, Dante averaged 2.8 points and 4.3 rebounds in 9.2 minutes per game, as his team finished in 15th place. He was named to the roster for Mali at the 2017 FIBA Under-16 African Championship in Mauritius, where his team captured the gold medal, but he did not record playing time.

Career statistics

College

|-
| style="text-align:left;"| 2019–20
| style="text-align:left;"| Oregon
| 12 || 0 || 13.6 || .627 || – || .400 || 2.8 || .6 || .9 || .6 || 5.8
|-
| style="text-align:left;"| 2020–21
| style="text-align:left;"| Oregon
| 6 || 6 || 17.7 || .656 || – || .438 || 5.8 || .2 || 1.5 || 1.2 || 8.2
|-
| style="text-align:left;"| 2021–22
| style="text-align:left;"| Oregon
| 32 || 27 || 20.0 || .675 || – || .588 || 6.3 || .7 || .7 || 1.0 || 8.1
|- class="sortbottom"
| style="text-align:center;" colspan="2"| Career
| 50 || 33 || 18.2 || .663 || – || .535 || 5.4 || .6 || .8 || .9 || 7.6

References

External links
Oregon Ducks bio

Living people
2001 births
Malian men's basketball players
Centers (basketball)
Oregon Ducks men's basketball players
Malian expatriate basketball people in the United States
Sportspeople from Bamako
21st-century Malian people